Targasonne (before 2022: Targassonne) is a commune of Cerdanya in the Pyrénées-Orientales department in south of France.

Targasonne is the home of the THEMIS Solar Power R&D Center.

Geography 
Targasonne is located in the canton of Les Pyrénées catalanes and in the arrondissement of Prades. It is located at 1,600 meters near the villages of Égat and Font-Romeu-Odeillo-Via. The closest cities are Foix in the North-West at 61 kilometres and Perpignan at 90 kilometres to the East.

Population

See also
Communes of the Pyrénées-Orientales department
THEMIS Solar Power R&D Center
Solar furnace in Odeillo
Cerdanya

References

Communes of Pyrénées-Orientales